Kim Hye-soo (Korean: 김혜수) (born June 27, 1993), better known as Lovey (Korean: 러비), is a South Korean singer-songwriter. She debuted in 2013. She has an elder brother who is also a singer-songwriter, Brother Su.

Career

RealCollabo days (2011–2015) 
During her RealCollabo days, Lovey was more known for her featuring works. Prior to her debut, in 2011 she was featured in Alex's "Tomboi". The next year, she was featured in Andup's "방 안에서 (In Room)", Giriboy's "선수 (Player)", and Crucial Star's "Flat Shoes".

On August 1, 2013 she released her first single "돌려줘 (Return)" which was composed by Brother Su. In the same year, she did featuring for Swings' "엄지 두 개 (Two Thumbs)" and "My Way", Brother Su's "다른 별 (Different Star)", and Kebee's "아이같니 (Like Kid)".

In 2014, Lovey was featured again in Swings' "주요 우울증 (Major Depression)", Crucial Star's "Pretty Girl", and Giriboy's "쌩얼 (Bare Face)".

In 2015, she was featured in Brother Su's "점 (Dot)". This is her last work under RealCollabo, which became defunct on October that year.

Self producing (2016–present) 
After RealCollabo's defunct, Lovey doesn't sign with other agencies. She continues releasing music with help of Starship Entertainment, where Brother Su is currently signed under. Lovey's second single "Not Enough" was released under Starship Entertainment on March 31.

On April 28, Starship released a video of Lovey and Cosmic Girls' Exy covering iKON's "My Type".

Lovey released her first extended play 24 on June 30.

Discography

Singles

As featured artist

Mini-album

Works as songwriter

References

External links 
Lovey's Instagram
Lovey's Twitter

1993 births
South Korean singer-songwriters
South Korean contemporary R&B singers
Living people
21st-century South Korean singers
21st-century South Korean women singers
South Korean women singer-songwriters